Mamdouh (also spelled Mamduh or Memduh) is a masculine given name and also, a surname. People with the name include:

Given name
Mamdouh Abbas, Egyptian businessman, twice Zamalek chairman
Mamdouh Bahri (born 1957), jazz guitarist who has combined Afro-Mediterranean music with a jazz tradition
Mamdouh Habib, Egyptian born Australian Muslim detained in the Guantanamo Bay detainment camps
Mamdouh Ismail, Egyptian defence attorney and a former member of "the Jihad group"
Mamdouh Hosny Khalil (born 1964), Egyptian politician
Mamdouh Kashlan (born 1929), Syrian painter
Mamdouh Mahmud Salim (born 1958), alleged co-founder of the Islamist terrorist network al-Qaeda
Mamdouh Marei (1938–2018), Egyptian jurist and politician
Mamdouh Salem (1918–1988), Prime Minister of Egypt from 1975 to 1978
Mamdouh bin Abdulaziz Al Saud (born 1940), Saudi royal
Memduh Ün (1920–2015), Turkish film producer and director

Surname 
Alia Mamdouh (born 1944), Iraqi novelist, author and journalist living in exile in Paris, France

See also
Mamdouh Ibrahim Ahmed Habib v. George Bush (Civil Action No. 02-CV-1130), writ of habeas corpus filed on behalf of Guantanamo detainee

Arabic masculine given names
Turkish masculine given names